The Yale was an automobile by the Kirk Manufacturing Company, a manufacturer of Brass Era automobiles in Toledo, Ohio from 1901 to 1905. It should not be confused with the Yale automobile made in Saginaw, Michigan from 1916 to 1918.

History

The 1904 Yale was a touring car.  Equipped with a tonneau, the basic model could seat 5 passengers and sold for US$1500. The car's engine was a horizontally mounted water-cooled flat-2, mid-mounted, which produced 16 hp (11.9 kW). It powered the wheels through a 2-speed transmission.  The car weighed 1800 lb (816 kg).

A model with a 30 hp (22.4 kW) engine sold for US$2500. A 12-horsepower Yale touring car was also sold in 1904 for US$1700. It was advertised nationally that year in Dun's Review as "the simplest, safest and most economical touring car made in America."

Advertisements

External links
 Frank Leslie's Popular Monthly (January, 1904)

References

Brass Era vehicles
Cars introduced in 1904
Motor vehicle manufacturers based in Ohio
Defunct motor vehicle manufacturers of the United States